"Tickles" is the tenth single by Swedish singer Elin Lanto from her second studio album Love Made Me Do It. The song is a further example of how Lanto has changed her musical style since her debut album One.

Music video
The music video for "Tickles" has seen completion and was directed by the same director behind Lanto's "Love Made Me Stupid" video. The video was released during the week beginning 26 April 2010.

References

External links

2010 singles
2010 songs